The Best NBA Player ESPY Award is an award presented annually since 1993 to a National Basketball Association (NBA) player adjudged to be the best in a given year, typically the NBA season contested during or immediately before the holding of the ESPY Awards ceremony.

Between 1993 and 2004, the award voting panel comprised variously fans; sportswriters and broadcasters, sports executives, and retired sportspersons, termed collectively experts.

Through the 2001 iteration of the ESPY Awards, ceremonies were conducted in February of each year to honor achievements over the previous calendar year; awards presented thereafter are conferred in June and reflect performance from the June previous. Seven players have won the award more than once; Michael Jordan won the inaugural award and a total of four across his career. LeBron James has won the award a total of seven times, the most by any player. Stephen Curry has won the award three times, while Tim Duncan, Kobe Bryant, Shaquille O'Neal, and Hakeem Olajuwon have claimed two each. The award wasn't awarded in 2020 due to the COVID-19 pandemic.

Winners
 Player was a member of the winning team in the NBA Finals.   Player was a member of the losing team in the NBA Finals. * NBA Regular Season MVP† NBA Finals MVP

By Player
Fourteen players have won the award.

By Team

See also
2012 ESPY Awards

Notes

References
ESPYS 2008: Best of the ESPYS

ESPY Awards
National Basketball Association lists